Milan Kobe (1926–1966) was a Yugoslav football player and manager.

Career
Born in Zagreb in 1926, Kobe was unfortunate to see the Second World War take much of his teenage years. He started playing in 1944 when the war was approaching its end when he joined one of Zagreb´s major clubs, HAŠK. When the war was over, Yugoslavia changed from monarchy to become a communist regime. Most of the Serbian pro-monarchic clubs, just as Croatian pro-Ustashe ones, were disbanded, and the new authorities formed numerous new clubs to replace them. One of them was FK Naša Krila Zemun, a club formed by the Yugoslav Air Force and based in Zemun where the bulk of the Yugoslav military aviation industry and its major bases were located. Solving this way the mandatory army conscription, Kobe moved from Zagreb to Zemun, located just in the outskirts of capital Belgrade. Surprisingly, The Aviators formed a strong diversified team, which feared no opposition and recognised no inferiority. Kobe joined in 1948, when the club had achieved promotion to the Yugoslav First League and, besides, reached the Yugoslav Cup final, all in their previous season which was their inaugural one. In his first season at Naša Krila, Kobe and his companions finished 5th among 10 clubs forming the 1948–49 Yugoslav First League. However, even more impressive was that Naša Krila reached a second Cup final in three years of existence, and, although this time Kobe was in the team, they ended again being the losing finalist, this time against Red Star Belgrade. Naša Krila, however, suffered the destiny of the Zemun's military aircraft industry, which the authorities decided to shot down and move to Mostar, in southern SR Bosnia and Herzegovina, where the factories were reopened as SOKO and begin production in 1950, the year Naša krila played its last season before ceasing to exist.

In 1950 the players of Naša Krila are released, and Kobe returned to Zagreb and joined NK Zagreb, playing at national top-level as NK Borac Zagren back then. After two seasons, he moved to another local top-flight side, NK Lokomotiva, where he played until 1955.

With a status of an already experienced player, he moved to Osijek, and joined an ambitious Yugoslav Second League side, NK Osijek, known back then as NK Proleter Osijek. His link with Osijek from then on grew strong, and after 3 seasons as player, when he retired he stayed in the club and became the coordinator of the Youth teams programme. He also had later episodes of being the main coach of lower-level local teams such as Sloga Đurđenovci and TIKO Osijek.

He stayed in Osijek for the rest of his life, which ended in Osijek in 1966.

References

1926 births
1966 deaths
Footballers from Zagreb
Yugoslav footballers
Association football midfielders
HAŠK players
FK Naša Krila Zemun players
NK Zagreb players
NK Lokomotiva Zagreb players
NK Osijek players
Yugoslav First League players
Yugoslav football managers